Austin Springs is an unincorporated community in Washington County, Tennessee. Austin Springs is located northwest of Johnson City.

History
A post office called Austin's Springs was established in 1875, and remained in operation until it was discontinued in 1900. The community was named for one or both of the Austin brothers who started a hotel at the site of a mineral spa.

References

Unincorporated communities in Washington County, Tennessee
Unincorporated communities in Tennessee
Neighborhoods in Johnson City, Tennessee